In mathematics, the Zeeman conjecture or Zeeman's collapsibility conjecture asks whether given a finite contractible 2-dimensional CW complex , the space  is collapsible.

The conjecture, due to Christopher Zeeman, implies the Poincaré conjecture and the Andrews–Curtis conjecture.

References

Conjectures
Unsolved problems in geometry
Geometric topology